The 1988 Campeonato Brasileiro Série A was the 32nd edition of the Campeonato Brasileiro Série A. As the 1987 Copa União organized by the Clube dos 13 proved to be even more disastrously organized than the criticized 1986 edition, organized by the CBF, the 1988 featured the merging of both modules to feature the first ever tournament with real two divisions with promotion and relegation. The 1988 season began on September 2, 1988, and reached its end on February 19, 1989. The competition was won by Esporte Clube Bahia. Internacional's Nílson, with 15 goals, was the competition's top goal scorer.

Overview
It was performed by 24 teams, and Bahia won the championship. The four worst-placed teams, which were Bangu, Santa Cruz, Criciúma, and América-RJ, were relegated to the following year's second level.

Competition format
First Phase The 24 clubs were divided in two groups of 12 teams each. In the first stage all teams played against the ones of the opposite group. At the second stage, all teams played against the ones of their same group. A penalty shootout was played after the games that ended in a draw, the penalty shootout winner earned two points while the loser earned one point. The two best-placed clubs of each group in the first stage plus the two best-placed clubs of each group in the second stage qualified to the Second Phase.

Second Phase This phase was divided in Quarterfinals, Semifinals and the Final. Each round was played in two legs. An extra time match should happen after the second match in case of draw at goal difference. Teams with superior score on the First Phase had the benefit of qualifying or being the champions in case of a persisting draw after extra time. The penalty shootout rule was no longer applied on this phase at all.

Participating clubs

Group A
Atlético Mineiro
Atlético Paranaense
Bangu
Flamengo
Fluminense
Goiás
Internacional
Palmeiras
Portuguesa
São Paulo
Sport
Vitória

Group B
América-RJ
Bahia
Botafogo
Corinthians
Coritiba
Criciúma
Cruzeiro
Grêmio
Guarani
Santa Cruz
Santos
Vasco da Gama

Standings

First phase

First stage
Group A

Group B

Second stage
Group A

Group B

Second phase

*Fluminense defeated Vasco da Gama on Extra Time by 2-0.

*Bahia defeated Sport after two draws for having a superior score point on the first phase. Extra time was 0-0.

The final

Bahia: Ronaldo; Tarantini, João Marcelo, Claudir and Edinho; Paulo Rodrigues, Zé Carlos and Bobô; Osmar, Charles (Sandro) and Marquinhos. Head coach: Evaristo de Macedo.

Internacional: Taffarel; Luiz Carlos Winck (Diego Aguirre), Aguirregaray, Nenê and João Luís; Norberto, Luís Carlos Martins and Leomir; Maurício (Hélder), Nílson and Edu. Head coach: Abel Braga.

Internacional: Taffarel; Luiz Carlos Winck, Aguirregaray, Norton and Casemiro; Norberto, Luis Fernando and Luís Carlos Martins; Maurício (Hélder), Nílson and Edu. Head coach: Abel Braga.

Bahia: Ronaldo; Tarantini, João Marcelo, Claudir (Newmar) and Paulo Róbson; Paulo Rodrigues, Zé Carlos and Bobô (Osmar); Gil, Charles and Marquinhos. Head coach: Evaristo de Macedo.

Final standings

References

External links
 Campeonato Brasileiro Série A 1988 at RSSSF

1988
1
Bra
Bra